Pheromones is the first studio album released by the Norwegian band Animal Alpha. The track "Bundy" was featured in the video games NHL 06 and Burnout Revenge for the PlayStation 2 and Xbox 360 and Burnout Legends for the PSP. "Bundy" is also included in the end credits of the film Hansel & Gretel: Witch Hunters, but is not included in the film's soundtrack.

Track listing
All songs composed by Animal Alpha 

 "Billy Bob Jackson" – 4:09
 "I.R.W.Y.T.D" – 2:44
 "Bundy" – 3:47
 "Most Wanted Cowboy" – 5:37
 "Catch Me" – 2:36
 "101 Ways" – 5:52
 "Deep In" – 4:23
 "My Droogies" – 5:44
 "Bend Over" – 4:35
 "Remember The Day" – 2:47

References

2005 albums
Animal Alpha albums